Drwalewice  is a village in the administrative district of Gmina Kożuchów, within Nowa Sól County, Lubusz Voivodeship, in western Poland.

The village has a population of 95.

History
In the 14th century Drwalewice belonged to the Unruh family. Hans Wolff von Unruh, the last of the Unruhs to preside over the village, had a renaissance manor-house built in the village in the mid-16th century. The von Braun family later ruled over the town, including Dietrich von Braun who was murdered by his brother Wolff.  According to local legend this was due to a dispute between Dietrich and Wolff von Braun over a girl. In 1875 the manor-house was replaced by the neo-gothic palace that presently stands in the village. After world war two, the former von Braun estate was converted into a state farm and the place was used as a residence.

References

Villages in Nowa Sól County